This is a list of years in Moldova.

16th century

17th century

18th century

19th century

20th century

21st century

See also
 List of years in Romania
 Timeline of Chișinău

Further reading

External links
 BBC News. Moldova Profile: Timeline.

Years in Moldova
Moldova history-related lists
Moldova